Johann Jakob Rüttimann (17 March 1813 – 10 January 1876) was a Swiss politician, President of the Swiss Council of States (1850/1851 and 1865/1866) and President of the Federal Supreme Court (1854).

External links 

1813 births
1876 deaths
Politicians from Zürich
Swiss Calvinist and Reformed Christians
Members of the Council of States (Switzerland)
Presidents of the Council of States (Switzerland)
Federal Supreme Court of Switzerland judges
19th-century Swiss politicians
19th-century Swiss judges
Academic staff of ETH Zurich